Reto Capadrutt (4 March 1912 – 3 February 1939) was a Swiss bobsledder who competed in the 1930s. Competing in two Winter Olympics, he won a silver medal in the two-man event in 1932 and another silver medal in the four-man event in 1936.

Capadrutt also won three medals at the FIBT World Championships, with one gold (Two-man: 1935) and two bronzes (Two-man: 1937, Four-man: 1935).

At the time of the 1932 Winter Olympics, he was linked to a romantic relationship with Elizabeth "Betty" Hood, daughter of John Ahearn. Ahearn was involved in New York City's Tammany Hall politics during the 1920s and 1930s.

He was killed competing in the four-man event at the 1939 FIBT World Championships in Cortina d'Ampezzo, Italy.

References
 1936 bobsleigh two-man results
 Adirondack Daily Enterprise article on Capadrutt's romance to Hood - accessed November 28, 2007.
 Bobsleigh two-man Olympic medalists 1932-56 and since 1964
 Bobsleigh four-man Olympic medalists for 1924, 1932-56, and since 1964
 Bobsleigh two-man world championship medalists since 1931
 Bobsleigh four-man world championship medalists since 1930

1912 births
1939 deaths
Bobsledders at the 1932 Winter Olympics
Bobsledders at the 1936 Winter Olympics
Bobsledders who died while racing
Olympic bobsledders of Switzerland
Olympic silver medalists for Switzerland
Swiss male bobsledders
Sport deaths in Italy
Olympic medalists in bobsleigh
Medalists at the 1932 Winter Olympics
Medalists at the 1936 Winter Olympics
20th-century Swiss people